Lieutenant Ernest Lindup  was a South African World War I flying ace credited with five aerial victories.

Lindup scored five victories between 4 February and 31 May 1918 while flying a Bristol F.2 Fighter. His observer gunners included fellow aces M. B. Mather, Ernest Deighton, and Henry Crowe.

Sources of information

References
Above the Trenches: a Complete Record of the Fighter Aces and Units of the British Empire Air Forces 1915–1920. Christopher F. Shores, Norman L. R. Franks, Russell Guest. Grub Street, 1990. , .

Royal Flying Corps officers
Recipients of the Military Cross
South African World War I flying aces
White South African people